The 1915 Cork Junior Hurling Championship was the 21st staging of the Cork Junior Hurling Championship since its establishment by the Cork County Board.

On 12 December 1915, Carrigtwohill won the championship following a 1-02 to 1-00 defeat of Knockavilla in the final at the Cork Athletic Grounds. This was their first ever championship title.

Results

Final

References

Cork Junior Hurling Championship
Cork Junior Hurling Championship